Gopal Dhinakar Raj is an Indian veterinary scientist, an academic and the project director of the Translational Research Platform for Veterinary Biologicals, a partnership program between the Department of Biotechnology and the Tamil Nadu Veterinary and Animal Sciences University. Known for the development of diagnostic test kits for animal and poultry diseases such as Leptospirosis and Egg drop syndrome, Raj is a member of the DBT Task Force on Animal Biotechnology. The Department of Biotechnology of the Government of India awarded him the National Bioscience Award for Career Development, one of the highest Indian science awards, for his contributions to biosciences in 2007.

Biography 
Born in the south Indian state of Tamil Nadu, Dhinakar Raj did his undergraduate studies at Madras Veterinary College and obtained the degree of BVSc from the Tamilnadu Agricultural University in 1986, standing first in the university which earned him four gold medals. Subsequently, he completed his master's studies in biotechnology at the Indian Veterinary Research Institute in 1989 and moved to the UK for his doctoral studies on a Commonwealth Fellowship program to secure a PhD in 1997. His post-doctoral work was, at first, at the University of Nebraska in 2001 and later at Pirbright Institute (then known as the Institute for Animal Health) in 2008. In between he joined the Tamil Nadu Veterinary and Animal Sciences University (TANUVAS) as an associate professor where he is a professor and serves as the project director of the Translational Research Platform for Veterinary Biologicals, a collaborative initiative between the Department of Biotechnology and TANUVAS. He currently serves as Director, Centre for Animal Heath Studies (CAHS) and Director, Veterinary Incubation Foundation @ TANUVAS, a Section 8 company established by Tamil Nadu Veterinary and Animal Sciences University, Chennai.

Legacy 

Raj, who specializes in animal biotechnology, focuses his work in the fields of molecular diagnostics and immunology and has carried out research on the development of diagnostic kits for various animal and poultry diseases. The team led by him at TANUVAS is reported to have developed a methodology for detecting Bluetongue disease which uses latex beads smeared with specially developed monoclonal antibodies by the team. In 2015, he led the team that developed a diagnostic kit for Leptospirosis (rat fever), a common disease spread by infected rats. The kit, jointly developed by scientists from TANUVAS and the department of microbiology of the Government General Hospital, Chennai, was cheaper by one-fifth of the price of similar kits available in the market at that time. His contributions are also reported in the development and validation of a Peste des petits ruminants (PPR) Vaccine, sexing kits for emus, biomarkers for chicken and nanoparticle-coupled vaccine for Newcastle disease. Molecular biological studies of the viruses that cause egg drop syndrome, bronchitis, rabies and chikungunya as well as immunological studies of the genetic resistance of Indian goats and buffaloes are some of his other contributions. His studies have been documented by way of a number of articles and ResearchGate, an online repository of scientific articles has listed 113 of them. Besides, he is the author of two books, Animal Biotechnology: Vaccines and Diagnostics-Markets and Investment Opportunities and Monoclonal Antibodies Application in Disease and Health. He holds an Indian patent and eight of his patent applications are pending approval. He is a former member of the editorial board of Avian Pathology journal of Taylor & Francis and a member of the Task Force on Animal Biotechnology of the Department of Biotechnology. He is also associated with the Indian Society For Veterinary Immunology And Biotechnology (ISVIB) and serves as its vice president.

Awards and honors  
Raj received the Dr. F. M. Burnett Award of the Indian Society For Veterinary Immunology And Biotechnology in 2006. The Department of Biotechnology (DBT) of the Government of India awarded him the National Bioscience Award for Career Development, one of the highest Indian science awards in 2007. He received the Tata Innovation Fellowship of the DBT in 2012.

Selected bibliography

Books

Articles

See also 

 Monoclonal antibody therapy
 Rhipicephalus haemaphysaloides

Notes

References

External links 
 
 
 

N-BIOS Prize recipients
Indian scientific authors
Living people
Scientists from Chennai
Indian veterinarians
Indian medical researchers
University of Madras alumni
Alumni of the University of Liverpool
University of Nebraska alumni
Indian patent holders
1964 births
21st-century American inventors